Clepsis sarthana is a species of moth of the family Tortricidae. It is found in Central Asia, including Tajikistan, Kazakhstan, Kyrgyzstan and Uzbekistan.

The wingspan is 21–22 mm for males and about 24 mm for females.

The larvae feed on Acer species.

References

Moths described in 1894
Clepsis